Love's Penalty is a 1921 American drama film written and directed by John Gilbert. The film stars Hope Hampton, Irma Harrison, Mrs. Phillip Landau, Percy Marmont, John B. O'Brien, and Virginia Valli. The film was released in June 1921, by Associated First National Pictures.

Plot
In this melodramatic silent film, Janis Clayton (Hope Hampton) seeks revenge for the death of her sister Sally (Irma Harrison) and mother Martha (Mrs. Phillip Landau). To accomplish this, Janis becomes the personal secretary of Steven Saunders (Percy Marmont), the man responsible for their deaths, and seduces him. She then convinces Saunders to murder his wife (Virginia Vallie) by sending her to Europe on a ship destined for dangerous waters. After the ship sinks, Janis reveals her plan to ruin him. Saunders is furious and attempts to kill her, but he is shot by a Bohemian artist whose wife and child also died in the shipwreck. After all is done, Janis lives as an outcast and eventually finds sanctuary in the home of a friendly minister named Reverend John Kirchway (Charles Lane). The film ends when Janis is reunited with her former lover, Bud (John B. O'Brien).

Cast       
Hope Hampton as Janis Clayton
Irma Harrison as Sally Clayton
Mrs. Phillip Landau as Martha Clayton
Percy Marmont as Steven Saunders
John B. O'Brien as Bud Gordon 
Virginia Valli as Mrs. Steven Saunders
Douglas Redmond as 'Little Jack'
Charles Lane as Rev. John Kirchway
Mrs. L. Faure as Madame Natalie

Production 
A revised version of "Love's Penalty" was retitled and edited by Katherine Hilliker, one of Hollywood's first female film editors. Hilliker had a reputation for "rescuing problem-plagued film," and in a review of her revised version of "Love's Penalty" the Motion Picture News wrote, "Miss Hilliker, in remoulding the picture, has supplied logical reasons for previously shallow spots . . . and made the photoplay a most interesting drama."

References

External links

1921 films
1920s English-language films
Silent American drama films
1921 drama films
First National Pictures films
Films directed by John Gilbert
American silent feature films
American black-and-white films
1920s American films